Stairway to the Stars was an early Australian television series that aired on Melbourne station HSV-7. The first episode aired 9 November 1956, with the series ending circa November 1958.

Hosts of the series included Eric Pearce for early episodes and Geoff McComas for later episodes.

Originally broadcast on Fridays, it later moved to Wednesdays. Competition in the time-slot varied. At first, since HSV-7 was the only station in Melbourne, the series had no competition in the time-slot. By March 1957 the series competed against U.S. series Alfred Hitchcock Presents on GTV-9 and UK series The World is Ours on ABV-2. By November 1958 episodes competed against U.S. comedy series Susie on GTV-9, while ABV-2 featured Election Talk and UK series Fabian of the Yard.

The series was a talent show. For example, the episode broadcast 21 December 1956 featured a pop vocalist, a soprano, a dancer, a tenor, and a saxophonist, as well as Sonia Korn as the guest.

References

External

Seven Network original programming
1956 Australian television series debuts
1958 Australian television series endings
Black-and-white Australian television shows
English-language television shows
Australian variety television shows